Yeh Meri Family is an Indian comedy drama web series, created and directed by Sameer Saxena for The Viral Fever. The script was written by Saurabh Khanna, as his first writing project. The series follows the life of a 12-year-old Harshu Gupta, played by Vishesh Bansal, in Jaipur, Rajasthan in the late 1990s. It also stars Mona Singh, Akarsh Khurana, Ahan Nirban, Ruhi Khan, Prasad Reddy, as members of the Gupta family and their acquaintances.

The first season of the Yeh Meri Family, consisting of seven episodes, premiered on TVFPlay and YouTube on 12 July 2018; it has also been available on Netflix. The series received a positive response, with particular praise for its use of nostalgia and performances of the cast.

Synopsis
Set in Jaipur, Rajasthan in the year 1998, the series follows the story told from the point of view of the 12-year-old Harshu Gupta and his family, the various trials and tribulations experienced in their day-to-day lives.

Cast
 Vishesh Bansal as Harshal "Harshu" Gupta, the series' 12-year-old narrator. 
 Mona Singh as Poorva Gupta, Harshu's mother.
 Akarsh Khurana as Devendra Gupta, Harshu's father.
 Ahan Nirban as Devansh "Dabbu" Gupta, Harshu's elder brother.
 Ruhi Khan as Dhwani "Chitti" Gupta, Harshu's younger sister. 
 Prasad Reddy as Shanky, Harshu's best friend.
 Revathi Pillai as Vidhya M. Ranganath, Harshu's love interest 
 Brij Bhushan Shukla as Verma Sir, Harshu's Hindi teacher.
 Abhay Pannu as Laxy

Episodes

Production 
The creator of The Viral Fever, Arunabh Kumar stated about the concept of making a family-drama series, as according to Arunabh, film and television shows had lacked a good concept of a family drama in the past 20 years, in which a story that everyone can relate to. He wanted to bring the dynamics of the quintessential India family, which was the main core concept of the show. It was set in the 1990s as Arunabh stated that the time period was very organic because "just like the family relationships, 90s had a certain innocence about them".

While Biswapati Sarkar, who worked in TVF's earlier projects was approached to write the script. The media's co-director Sameer Saxena, suggested Saurabh Khanna's name for the show. It was Saurabh's maiden attempt in writing. Mona Singh was approached to play the role of Vishesh Bansal's mother , while Akarsh Khurana made his acting debut with the series. Arunabh chose the background to be set in Jaipur as he found the city was neither too urban nor too rural. It's a very appropriate representation of the middle-class India, for which it gave the show a very suitable backdrop.

Arunabh also noted about directing with kids, as he stated "Before we went on floor, I was skeptical about shooting with the kids. I thought it would be very challenging. But to my surprise, all the kids were extremely hard working and dedicated. They always used to come on set all prepared with the lines and that made the shoot a lot easy. Rehearsing with them during the pre-production stage also helped to prepare them well for the shoot. Saxena said that he was skeptical about shooting with the kids before the show went on the floor."

Soundtrack 

The series' soundtrack album is composed by Vaibhav Bundhoo, Rohit Sharma, Simran Hora, Nilotpal Bora and Ishan Das with lyrics written by Hussain Haidry, Vaibhav Bundhoo, Swapnil Tiwari and Manoj Kumar Nath.

Release
The Viral Fever announced four new series on 23 June 2018, with Yeh Meri Family being one of them. The official trailer was presented by TVF through their YouTube channel on 28 June 2018. The first two episodes of the series was released simultaneously through TVF Play and YouTube on 12 July 2018. The remaining episodes were later released on 20 July 2018.  It has since been made available for streaming on Netflix.

Reception
Yeh Meri Family opened to positive response from critics, who appreciated the series' use of nostalgia and the performances of the cast. Firstpost critic Shreya Paul, wrote in her review stating that "With a strong cast and seemingly strong content, Yeh Meri Family may surprise audiences with its ordinary brilliance." Writing for Scroll.in, Sowmya Rao stated "Yeh Meri Family’s strong point is the way it captures the essence of the ’90s, a time when India was on the cusp of economic, social and cultural change. That conflict between old and new infused an inter-generational dynamic exclusive to that era, which is aptly reflected in Harshu’s relationship with his parents." Rahul Desai of Film Companion wrote "Yeh Meri Family becomes a series that doesn’t demand our complete attention. It occasionally counts on the fact that we can drift away, recall similar observations from our own heydays and seamlessly return to the household as an organic extension of those memories."

References

External links
 

TVF Play Shows
Hindi-language web series
2018 web series debuts
Indian drama web series
Television series set in 1998